The discography of Mel B, an English pop singer-songwriter, consists of two studio albums, six singles, six music videos and one DVD.

On 9 October 2000 she released her first studio album, "Hot", which also included her number one duet with Missy Elliott for the song "I Want You Back". The second single release from the album was "Word Up", reaching No. 14 in the UK. "Tell Me" was released in 2000, debuted at No. 4 on the UK Singles Chart. The song sold approximately 100,000 copies, making it the 158th highest-selling single of 2000. A fourth single was released in February 2001, "Feels So Good", which peaked at No. 5, followed by a final single, "Lullaby", a pop number dedicated to her daughter. The single entered and peaked at No. 13. The album was not a success and garnered mediocre reviews, selling 7,419 copies in its first week and charting at No. 28, before quickly falling out of the charts, leading to Virgin dumping Brown from their label.

In 2005 Brown decided to release a new album by independent label Amber Café. L.A. State of Mind was released on 27 June 2005 in two formats: as a regular CD and as a limited edition with a DVD documentary. The only single from the album, "Today", peaked at number 41 in the UK. The album did not reach the UK Albums Chart.

In September 2013, Brown independently released her first single in eight years, "For Once in My Life".

Studio albums

Singles

As main artist

As featured artist

Music videos

Guest appearances

References

External links
 
 
 Mel B.: It's a Scary World

Discographies of British artists
Pop music discographies
Discography